A Beautiful Disaster is the fourth studio album by American rapper JellyRoll. It was released on March 13, 2020 through Strange Music and It Goes Up. It features guest appearances from Krizz Kaliko, Lil Wyte, Struggle Jennings and Tech N9ne among others. The album debuted at number 97 on the US Billboard 200 in the United States.

Four music videos were released for the songs "Creature" with Tech N9ne and Krizz Kaliko, "I Need You", "Nothing Left at All" and "Tears Could Talk" with Bailee Ann.

Track listing

Charts

References

2020 albums
Jelly Roll (singer) albums
Albums produced by Seven (record producer)